Angel Stoyanov Kerezov (born 24 July 1939) is a retired flyweight Greco-Roman wrestler from Bulgaria. He won a silver medal at the 1964 Olympics and a world title in 1966, placing third in 1965 and fourth in 1963.

References

1939 births
Living people
People from Burgas Province
Olympic wrestlers of Bulgaria
Wrestlers at the 1964 Summer Olympics
Bulgarian male sport wrestlers
Olympic silver medalists for Bulgaria
Olympic medalists in wrestling
Medalists at the 1964 Summer Olympics